Valdemar Aguirre Cordova (December 6, 1922 – June 18, 1988) was a United States district judge of the United States District Court for the District of Arizona.

Education and career

Born in Phoenix, Arizona, Cordova was in the United States Army during World War II, from 1940 to 1945. Serving in the United States Army Air Corps as a Lieutenant later in the war, he was shot down during a mission over Germany and captured. He subsequently spent 18 months in Stalag Luft I near Barth, Germany. After being liberated and discharged from the army, Cordova received a Juris Doctor from the James E. Rogers College of Law at the University of Arizona in 1950. He was in private practice in Phoenix from 1950 to 1965. He was a superior court judge in Maricopa County, Arizona from 1965 to 1967, and from 1976 to 1979, returning in the interim to private practice in Phoenix.

Federal judicial service

On April 30, 1979, Cordova was nominated by President Jimmy Carter to a new seat on the United States District Court for the District of Arizona created by 92 Stat. 1629. He was confirmed by the United States Senate on June 19, 1979, and received his commission on June 21, 1979. On or about April 20, 1984, the president certified Cordova involuntarily as disabled pursuant to the act of September 2, 1957, 71 Stat. 586. The certification was due to the effect of a serious stroke Cordova suffered earlier in 1984. Due to his involuntary certification of disability, Cordova ceased to perform any judicial duties, but continued to remain in active judicial status until his death.

Death

Cordova died on June 18, 1988, from continuing complications of his 1984 stroke.

Scholarship

On March 1, 2018, the University of Arizona announced the creation of the Honorable Judge Valdemar Aguirre Cordova Scholarship, created by a $100,000 gift from the Arizona Hispanic Bar Association.  The scholarship will be available to students studying law at the University of Arizona.

See also
List of Hispanic/Latino American jurists

References

Sources
 

1922 births
1988 deaths
Hispanic and Latino American judges
James E. Rogers College of Law alumni
Judges of the United States District Court for the District of Arizona
United States district court judges appointed by Jimmy Carter
20th-century American judges
United States Army Air Forces officers
Superior court judges in the United States
United States Army Air Forces personnel of World War II